Rachiptera limbata is a species of tephritid or fruit flies in the genus Rachiptera of the family Tephritidae.

Distribution
Bolivia, Chile, Argentina.

References

Tephritinae
Diptera of South America
Insects described in 1859